Sphegina cornifera is a species of hoverfly.

Distribution
Switzerland.

References

Eristalinae
Diptera of Europe
Insects described in 1921
Taxa named by Theodor Becker